The New Southbound Policy is an initiative of the Government of the Republic of China (Taiwan) under President Tsai Ing-wen that aims to enhance cooperation and exchange between Taiwan and 18 countries in Southeast Asia, South Asia and Australasia.

James C. F. Huang was appointed the first Director of the New Southbound Policy Office.

History
During the Cold War, the Republic of China was aligned with a number of countries in the Southeast Asia region in an anti-communist alliance during the Vietnam War. 

The policy was created to make Taiwan less dependent on Mainland China and to improve Taiwan's cooperation with other countries. The policy was officially launched on 5 September 2016.

Cooperation countries 
The 18 countries targeted by the New Southbound Policy are: Thailand, Indonesia, Philippines, Malaysia, Singapore, Brunei, Vietnam, Myanmar, Cambodia, Laos, India, Pakistan, Bangladesh, Nepal, Sri Lanka, Bhutan, Australia and New Zealand.

Connection to Free and Open Indo Pacific (FOIP) strategy 

In order to support the aims of the New Southbound Policy, the Ministry of Foreign Affairs Department of East Asian and Pacific Affairs officially established the Indo-Pacific Affairs Section. One focus of the Indo-Pacific section is to forge more cooperative ties with the United States, Australia, and Japan, all of whom have share similar visions for a Free and Open Indo-Pacific, FOIP.

Profiles of cooperating countries 

Taiwan ranks 15th in 2018 Ease of doing business index out of 190 countries.

Cooperation aspects 
The New Southbound Policy is for Taiwan to cooperate with 18 countries in the following aspects:
 Trade
 Technology
 Agriculture
 Medicine
 Education
 Tourism

Implementation measures

Promote economic collaboration
 Trade offices will be set up by the Ministry of Economic Affairs in India, Indonesia, Myanmar and Thailand to assist the local integration of Taiwanese companies
 Interested Taiwanese businesses will be able to access market and investment information of all countries covered under the New Southbound Policy via newly established information services

Conduct talent exchange
 The Taiwan Education Center, Foundation for International Cooperation in Higher Education of Taiwan and universities in Taiwan help execute higher education talents exchange programs, including teaching Taiwanese Mandarin in cooperated countries locally and accept students from cooperated countries to apply for scholarships to study in Taiwan.

Share resources
 Expanding scholarships to students from ASEAN countries up to 60,000 students by 2019.

Visas for the cooperation countries 
 In order to improve tourism, especially from Southeast Asian countries, Taiwan has expanded visa-free entry for citizens of the Philippines, Thailand, Russia, and Brunei up until 2021.

Budget
The operational budget for the policy implementation is taken from the Presidential Office budget.

Slogans
The slogan "Taiwan helps Asia, and Asia helps Taiwan” has been promoted by President Tsai.

See also
 Foreign relations of Taiwan

References

External links
 New Southbound Policy Portal

2016 establishments in Taiwan
Foreign relations of Taiwan
Public policy in Taiwan